Arbanitis hirsutus is a species of armoured trap-door spider in the family Idiopidae,  and is endemic to New South Wales and Queensland. 

It was first described by William Joseph Rainbow and Robert Henry Pulleine in 1918 as Arbanitis hirsutus, but was transferred to the genus, Dyarcyops, in 1977 by Barbara Main and then in 2017 Michael Rix and others returned it to the genus, Arbanitis.

References

Idiopidae
Spiders described in 2011
Spiders of Australia
Fauna of New South Wales
Fauna of Queensland